Malham Tarn is a glacial lake near the village of Malham in the Yorkshire Dales, England. The lake is one of only eight upland alkaline lakes in Europe. Its geology, flora and fauna have led to it being listed under a number of conservation designations. The site is currently owned by the National Trust, who used to lease part of the site to the Field Studies Council but this closed as a field centre in 2022. The site was the inspiration for Charles Kingsley's 1863 novel The Water-Babies, A Fairy Tale for a Land Baby.

Geography
Malham Tarn is situated in the Yorkshire Dales, a national park in the Yorkshire Pennines.

It is, however, the highest marl lake in Great Britain. The lake is one of only eight upland alkaline lakes in Europe, having a pH between 8.0 and 8.6. It takes approximately 11 weeks for water to leave the lake after it has entered. The primary outflow is a small stream at the southern end of the lake. The outflow stream goes underground after approximately  before emerging downstream of Malham Cove as a source of the River Aire.

Climate
The highest recorded temperature at Malham Tarn was 28.6°C on 24 July 2019.

Natural history
Situated in a limestone area, Malham Tarn itself mainly lies on a bed of silurian slate which is covered with marl deposits. The lake's basin was dammed by a moraine at the end of the last glacial period, approximately  years ago. It used to be about twice its current size, having shrunk due to silting at the western shore; this has formed a boggy region called Tarn Moss. Following deforestation during the Iron Age, the land surrounding the lake has been used for grazing which has prevented further tree growth.

The lake is home to six species of fish, as well as white-clawed crayfish, great crested grebes, moorhens, coots, tufted ducks and teal. A number of waders such as redshanks, curlews, lapwings and oystercatchers breed in the surrounding area. Two rare benthic copepods, Bryocamptus rhaeticus and Moraria mrazeki, are found in the lake, along with 22 species of molluscs—nine of which are found at their highest altitude in Britain. The lake also contains a number of submerged aquatic plants, while the surrounding area is home to a diverse number of plants including wild cranberry, bearberry, crowberry, dark-leaved willow and purple moor grass. Last seen fifty years ago, captive-bred water voles (Arvicola amphibius) were reintroduced in August 2016. This is the highest reintroduction of water vole in the UK.

The lake is located in the Malham and Arncliffe Site of Special Scientific Interest which was established in 1955. In 1992, the lake and its wetlands were designated as a national nature reserve. The lake was listed as a Ramsar Convention site in 1993. It is also in the Craven Limestone Complex Special Area of Conservation.

History
There has been human activity at Malham Tarn dating back to the Mesolithic era when the shores of the lake were used for camping during hunting trips for deer and wild cattle. During the Bronze and Iron Ages, the surrounding area was settled by farmers who used the land for grazing. Following the Roman conquest of Britain the upland areas were not seen as attractive and the only Roman presence in the area was a marching camp on Malham Moor. During the Medieval period the lands were owned by the Monasteries, and their use for grazing continued. A survey undertaken in 1539 at the time of the dissolution of Fountains Abbey makes note of a farmstead on the northern shore of the lake.

Following the dissolution of the monasteries, the estates of Malham Moor then changed hands several times until they were eventually acquired by Thomas Lister—later to become the first Lord Ribblesdale—in the mid- to late-18th century. Lister then built a hunting lodge on the site of the old farm in the 1780s. The estate was then sold to businessman James Morrison in 1852. Following Morrison's death the estates were inherited by his son, Walter, in 1857. While visiting Walter Morrison in 1858, author Charles Kingsley was inspired to write the Victorian era novel The Water-Babies, A Fairy Tale for a Land Baby. Walter Morrison died in 1921 and the estate subsequently changed hands a number of times before being broken up. The house and the lake were eventually bought by Walter Morrison's great-niece, Mrs Hutton-Croft, in 1928. In 1946 Mrs Hutton-Croft presented the house to the National Trust, who manage the property and lease the house to the Field Studies Council, now called the Malham Tarn Field Studies Centre.  The house exterior and the surrounding countryside can be seen in the 1951 film Another Man's Poison.

References

External links

Malham-Arncliffe SSSI
Malham Tarn and Moor National Trust
Malham Tarn Field Centre
Malham Tarn NNR

Glacial lakes
Lakes of North Yorkshire
National nature reserves in England
Malham
Ramsar sites in England
Sites of Special Scientific Interest in North Yorkshire
Sites of Special Scientific Interest notified in 1955